A hydrogen sulfide sensor or H2S sensor is a gas sensor for the measurement of hydrogen sulfide.

Principle
The H2S sensor is a metal oxide semiconductor (MOS) sensor which operates by a reversible change in resistance caused by adsorption and desorption of hydrogen sulfide in a film with hydrogen sulfide sensitive material like tin oxide thick films and gold thin films. Current response time is 25 ppb to 10 ppm < one minute.

Applications
This type of sensor has been under constant development because of the toxic and corrosive nature of hydrogen sulfide:

The H2S sensor is used to detect hydrogen sulfide in the hydrogen feed stream of fuel cells to prevent catalyst poisoning and to measure the quality of guard beds used to remove sulfur from hydrocarbon fuels./-

Research
 2004 - a nanocrystalline SnO2–Ag on ceramic wafer sensor is reported.

See also
Calibration
CMOS
Drift (sensor)
Glossary of fuel cell terms
List of sensors
Microelectromechanical systems
Thin film metal oxide semiconductor

References 

Sensors
Gas sensors